Grace Episcopal Church is an historic Carpenter Gothic church in Georgetown, Colorado. Built in 1870, it now overlooks Interstate 70. Grace Episcopal is still an active church in the Episcopal Diocese of Colorado. On August 14, 1973, the church was added to the National Register of Historic Places.

History
The first Episcopal congregation in Georgetown was organized by 1867, eight years after Georgetown was founded. Its members included transplants to Georgetown from England, Cornwall, Wales, and the Eastern United States. The Church building was designed by local resident D. H. Joy, and construction began on the structure in 1869. A strong wind blew the half-completed structure down in November of that year, delaying construction until 1870. The building was finally consecrated in 1872.

The interior of the church reflects the wealth of Georgetown in the 1870s. The original pews, which are still in use today, are made of walnut. The pipe organ, constructed by C. Anderson in Denver, was purchased in 1877. Still in use, it is the oldest operational organ in the state. In 1882, a three-panel reredos was painted by Mrs. Anderson P. Stephens of Lawson, Colorado. The reredos still stands above the altar.

The church continued to draw a small congregation after the 1894 silver crash. At times it has shared priests with the Episcopal churches in Central City and Idaho Springs. Services are still held in the church every Sunday.

Historic preservation
Interest in preserving the church has been bolstered by the availability of funds which are taken by the State from gambling revenues in Central City and Black Hawk, for use in the preservation of historic buildings. The church received a State Historical Fund for exterior preservation in 2002.

In 2006, the church received a Stephen H. Hart Award from the Colorado Historical Society for their outstanding work in restoring the neighboring Snetzer Building.

See also

National Register of Historic Places listings in Clear Creek County, Colorado
 Grace Episcopal Church (disambiguation)

References

External links

Grace Episcopal Church
Grace Episcopal Church listing in The Episcopal Church Annual

Buildings and structures in Clear Creek County, Colorado
Cornish-American history
English-American history
Welsh-American history
Episcopal church buildings in Colorado
Churches on the National Register of Historic Places in Colorado
Carpenter Gothic church buildings in Colorado
Churches completed in 1870
19th-century Episcopal church buildings
National Register of Historic Places in Clear Creek County, Colorado